Dyer is a city in Gibson County, Tennessee, United States. The population was 2,341 at the 2010 census. Dyer was originally known as Dyer Station, a name given by railroad workers in the early days of rail.

Geography
Dyer is located at  (36.069267, -88.991620).

Demographics
As of the census of 2000, there were 2,406 people, 979 households, and 673 families residing in the city. The population density was 1,064.3 people per square mile (411.0/km2). There were 1,053 housing units at an average density of 465.8 per square mile (179.9/km2). The racial makeup of the city was 80.34% White, 18.54% African American, 0.08% Native American, 0.04% Asian, 0.04% Pacific Islander, 0.29% from other races, and 0.67% from two or more races. Hispanic or Latino of any race were 0.54% of the population.

There were 979 households, out of which 27.3% had children under the age of 18 living with them, 51.0% were married couples living together, 14.9% had a female householder with no husband present, and 31.2% were non-families. 28.6% of all households were made up of individuals, and 16.8% had someone living alone who was 65 years of age or older. The average household size was 2.34 and the average family size was 2.87.

In the city, the population was spread out, with 22.0% under the age of 18, 8.1% from 18 to 24, 23.5% from 25 to 44, 22.6% from 45 to 64, and 23.8% who were 65 years of age or older. The median age was 42 years. For every 100 females, there were 76.3 males. For every 100 females age 18 and over, there were 73.8 males.

The median income for a household in the city was $28,250, and the median income for a family was $35,667. Males had a median income of $27,539 versus $19,306 for females. The per capita income for the city was $14,587. About 11.0% of families and 14.7% of the population were below the poverty line, including 23.8% of those under age 18 and 11.7% of those age 65 or over.

Events
The annual Dyer Station Celebration is held during the week of the Fourth of July each year.  The celebration was started with the hard work of Johnny McIlwain to honor the memory of his aunt, Mrs. Georgia Ellis, Dyer's first female alderman.  Events include fireworks, singings, carnival, card tournaments, pet show, parade, street dance, talent show, etc.  There is something to do each day and night during the week-long celebration.

Media

Radio stations
 WCMT-FM 101.3 "The Freshest Hits The Hottest Hits"
 WWGY 99.3  "Today's Best Music with Ace & TJ in the Morning"
 WENK-AM 1240 "The Greatest Hits of All Time"
 WTPR-AM 710 "The Greatest Hits of All Time"

Newspaper
 Tri-City Reporter,  a weekly publication covering the towns of Dyer, Rutherford and Yorkville. The offices of the Tri-City Reporter are located on Main Street in Dyer.

Tornado of April 2, 2006
Dyer was hit directly by an F3 tornado on April 2, 2006, which devastated the town and left 15 people dead. Early estimates were that over 1,500 homes were destroyed in Dyer and other areas of Gibson County. Of the 15 people who died, five were in the nearby town of Bradford, including a family of four. Two died just east of Rutherford. The remaining deaths were in Dyer County, about 15 miles west of Dyer.

See also

 List of cities in Tennessee

References

External links

 
 City charter

Cities in Tennessee
Cities in Gibson County, Tennessee